Migdal Tefen is an industrial council in Israel, located in Upper Galilee. The industrial area was built in the 1980s. In 1991 it became the first industrial council in Israel.

Municipalities of Israel
Geography of Northern District (Israel)